Robert W. White (June 2, 1876 – July 15, 1959) was born in St Andrews, Scotland, and was a school teacher there before emigrating in 1894 to the United States to study agronomy at the University of Wisconsin-Madison. He worked as a professional and greenkeeper at several clubs and was an excellent clubmaker.  He first took up a post as professional at the Myopia Hunt Club in 1895 and served at a number of other clubs, including Shawnee Country Club in 1914. White helped many young men from the British Isles find work in the United States as golf professionals and greenkeepers.  White, who was best known as a golf course architect and golf administrator, was an accomplished golfer but didn't post many notable results. He entered and played in a few U.S. Open tournaments around the turn of the century, in 1897 and again in 1901.  In the 1897 U.S. Open, White carded rounds of 89-97=186 and finished well back in the field.

White served as president of the Western Professional Golfers' Association in 1908 and became the first president of the Professional Golfers' Association of America in 1916. He held the office through 1919. During his career he also designed a number of golf courses, many located in eastern Pennsylvania.  White also was one of the founders of the American Society of Golf Course Architects. He was inducted into the PGA Hall of Fame in 1994.

Courses designed
Note:  This list may be incomplete.

Source:

Berkleigh Country Club, Kutztown, Pennsylvania
Blue at East Potomac Public Golf Course - Public, Washington, D.C.
Blue/Red at Buck Hill Falls Golf Club, Buck Hill Falls, Pennsylvania
Cincinnati Country Club, Cincinnati, Ohio
Edward B. McLean Estate Private Golf Course at Wisconsin Avenue, Washington, D.C.
Glen Brook Country Club, Stroudsburg, Pennsylvania 
Green Brook Country Club North Caldwell, New Jersey
Green Hills Golf Course, Birdsboro, Pennsylvania
Harkers Hollow Golf Club, Phillipsburg, New Jersey 
Longue Vue Club, Verona, Pennsylvania
Manasquan River Golf Club, Brielle, New Jersey
Northampton Country Club, Easton, Pennsylvania
Ocean Forest Country Club, also known as Pine Lakes Country Club, Myrtle Beach, South Carolina, listed on the National Register of Historic Places in 1996.
Red at East Potomac Public Golf Course, Washington, D.C.
Red/White at Buck Hill Falls Golf Club, Buck Hill Falls, Pennsylvania
Richmond County Country Club, Staten Island, New York 
Rockland Country Club, Sparkill, New York
Shorehaven Golf Club, East Norwalk, Connecticut
Silver Spring Country Club, Ridgefield, Connecticut
Skytop Lodge, Skytop, Pennsylvania 
Swamp Fox Golf Club, Greeleyville, South Carolina
Water Gap Country Club, Delaware Water Gap, Pennsylvania
White at East Potomac Public Golf Course, Washington, D.C.

Death
White died in Myrtle Beach, South Carolina, in July 1959. He was survived by a son and two daughters.

References

External links
Golf Course Architect - Robert White - Myrtle Beach Golf

Scottish male golfers
American male golfers
Golf course architects
Golf administrators
Golfers from St Andrews
Scottish emigrants to the United States
1876 births
1959 deaths